Erich Wilbrecht (born November 12, 1961) is an American former biathlete. He competed in the men's sprint event at the 1992 Winter Olympics. Following his sporting career, Wilbrecht worked for Sotheby's International Realty.

References

External links
 

1961 births
Living people
American male biathletes
Olympic biathletes of the United States
Biathletes at the 1992 Winter Olympics
People from Marion, Illinois
Sportspeople from Illinois